is a Japanese football referee. He has officiated matches in numerous international tournaments including EAFF Championship and AFC Cup. Locally he has officiated regularly in the J. League. In 2012, he officiated in the English FA Cup and Professional Development League.

He broke the world record for the fastest red card decision in a professional league match on 15 April 2009, when he sent off Tokyo Verdy midfielder Tomo Sugawara 9 seconds into the match between Tokyo Verdy and Sagan Tosu.

Iida also officiated the pre season friendly between Melbourne Victory and Liverpool in front of over 95,000 spectators at the Melbourne Cricket Ground in 2013.

References

1981 births
Living people
Japanese football referees
AFC Asian Cup referees